Abrahamsson and Anderson v Fogelqvist (2000) C-407/98 is a Swedish and EU labour law case, concerning positive action.

Facts
Mr Anderson was slightly better qualified than his three female competitors for the post of Professor of Hydrospheric Science at the University of Göteborg. But the job was offered to one of the women, Ms Destouni, and when she turned it down, another of the women, Ms Fogelqvist was given the job. Ms Abrahamsson had complained that she was also better than Ms Fogelqvist, but that Mr Anderson was better than her. The universities’ policy was to hire sufficiently qualified people in underrepresented group, even if that meant as in this case a less qualified woman, unless ‘the difference between the candidates’ qualification is so great that such application would give rise to a breach of the requirement of objectivity in the making of appointments.’ This policy was adopted after an earlier recruitment drive had failed.

Judgment
The European Court of Justice held that this form of positive discrimination was unlawful because it overrode consideration of applicants' individual merits. A rule which required an underrepresented group to be promoted over the other was justified if two candidates were equally qualified and assessment was based on objective assessment of their personal situations. But that did not happen here. At paragraph 55 the Court stated,

See also

Briheche v Ministre de l’Interieure [2005] 1 CMLR 4 (C-319/03), rule struck down which indiscriminately favoured all widows over widowers, regardless of individual circumstances
Lommers v Minister van Landbouw, Natuurbeheer en Visserij [2002] ECR-I 2891 (C-476/99), rule upheld restricting child care places to female employees, so long as men with child care responsibilities could also benefit

References

2000 in the European Union
Court of Justice of the European Union case law
2000 in case law
2000 in Sweden
Swedish case law
University of Gothenburg
Affirmative action in Europe
European Union labour case law